Dancing Stage Max was released on November 25, 2005, by Konami to the European PlayStation 2 gaming audience. Dancing Stage Max was modeled after Dance Dance Revolution Extreme 2 in America and Dance Dance Revolution Strike in Japan, containing the new Dance Master Mode and improved EyeToy support. Max featured music by Natasha Bedingfield, Sugababes and Franz Ferdinand as well as new and old Konami Originals. Unlike the previous release, Dancing Stage Fusion, Max was not ported to the arcades.

Gameplay

Music

See also
Dance Dance Revolution Extreme 2
Dance Dance Revolution Strike

2005 video games
Dance Dance Revolution games
EyeToy games
PlayStation 2-only games
Video games developed in Germany
PlayStation 2 games